K. T. Pachaimal is an Indian politician and former member of the Tamil Nadu legislative assembly from Kanyakumari constituency. He represents Anna Dravida Munnetra Kazhagam party and won in the 2011 Tamil Nadu Legislative Assembly election. He is a former minister.

References 

People from Kanyakumari district
Members of the Tamil Nadu Legislative Assembly
All India Anna Dravida Munnetra Kazhagam politicians
Living people
State cabinet ministers of Tamil Nadu
Year of birth missing (living people)